Satna Junction railway station (station code: STA) is the main railway station in Satna, a major city of Madhya Pradesh, India. It is located about one km from city centre.  The station sees great usage, with more than 300 trains stopping here on a daily basis. There are mainly 3 platforms in Satna railway station. Satna railway station is the busiest and most earning station of the Jabalpur (Mahakaushal) region.

Electrification of Satna Junction was completed in 2020. After electrification up to Satna, electric trains between Satna and Katni electric locomotives are used. Now both the way satna-manikpur and satna-katni has been electrified.

Trains serving this station include the Rewa–Anand Vihar Superfast Express, Rewanchal Express, Nagpur–Rewa Superfast Express, Rajkot–Rewa Superfast Express, Bilaspur–Rewa Express, Rewa–Dr. Ambedkar Nagar Express, Bhagmati Express, Sanghamithra Express, Ganga Kaveri Express, Mahanagari Express, Khwaja Garib Nawaz Madar–Kolkata Express, Bhagalpur–Khwaja Garib Nawaz Madar Express, Mahakoshal Express and many more.

References

External links 
India Rail Info profile
West Central Railway website

Picture gallery

Jabalpur railway division
Satna
Railway stations in Satna district